Pheidole elongicephala is a species of ant in the genus Pheidole. It was discovered and described by Eguchi, K. in 2008.

References

elongicephala
Insects described in 2008